Franco Coop (27 September 1891 – 27 March 1962), was an Italian film actor. He appeared in 65 films between 1931 and 1960. He was born in Naples, Italy and died in Rome, Italy.

Selected filmography

 Before the Jury (1931)
 Mother Earth (1931)
 Five to Nil (1932)
 La segretaria per tutti (1933)
Nini Falpala (1933)
 My Little One (1933)
 Everybody's Woman (1934)
 The Last of the Bergeracs (1934)
 Lady of Paradise (1934)
 Aldebaran (1935)
 Those Two (1935)
 Sette giorni all'altro mondo (1936)
 The Amnesiac (1936)
 I'll Give a Million (1936)
 The Last Days of Pompeo (1937)
 Hands Off Me! (1937)
 The Three Wishes (1937)
 The Carnival Is Here Again (1937)
 The Count of Brechard (1938)
 Saint John, the Beheaded (1940)
 Captain Fracasse (1940)
 Don Pasquale (1940)
 The King's Jester (1941)
 The Man on the Street  (1941)
 The Happy Ghost (1941)
 Jealousy (1942)
 Without a Woman (1943)
 The Ways of Sin (1946)
 Baron Carlo Mazza (1948)
 Night Taxi (1950)
 The Transporter (1950)
 That Ghost of My Husband (1950)
 Tragic Spell (1951)
 Cavalcade of Song (1953)
 The Art of Getting Along (1954)
 Non perdiamo la testa (1959)

References

External links

1891 births
1962 deaths
Italian male film actors
20th-century Italian male actors